This is a list of notable Indian entrepreneurs.

References

 
Entrepreneurs